David Leslie Kennedy (born 25 April 1948) is an archaeologist and historian of the Roman Near East, with a focus on Aerial Archaeology, Roman landscape studies and the Roman military. He is Emeritus Professor and Senior Honorary Research Fellow in Roman Archaeology and History at the University of Western Australia.

Biography
David Kennedy completed a Bachelor of Arts (BA (Hons)) in Ancient History and Archaeology at the University of Manchester in 1974, and was awarded a Doctor of Philosophy (D.Phil.) by the University of Oxford in 1980. He taught at the University of Sheffield (1976–1989) and Boston University (1989–90) before taking up a position at the University of Western Australia in 1990, ultimately as a Winthrop Professor. He retired in October 2017, returned part-time on a research grant in 2018 and retired again in January 2020.

He has been a Tweedie Exploration Fellow (1976–7), a Cotton Fellow (2004–5), a Member (1986-7 and 2004) and Visitor (2005, 2012 and 2017) at the Institute for Advanced Study at Princeton, a Stanley J Seager Fellow at Princeton University (2005-6 and 2013) and Visiting Fellow at Brasenose College, University of Oxford (2013). In 1986–87 he held a Senior Fulbright Travel Scholarship (UK to USA) a University of Western Australia 75th Anniversary Award in 1993.

He is a Fellow of the Society of Antiquaries of London (1985– ) and of the Australian Academy of the Humanities (1995– ).

In 2002 Kennedy was awarded a Centenary Medal by the Australian Federal Government "for services to ... archaeology".

He is Chair of the Roman Archaeology Group (RAG), Perth, established in 2004 to promote interest in Roman Archaeology.

Scholarship
David Kennedy's research focus is on the Roman Near East, with an emphasis on Jordan. His interests encapsulate Roman landscape studies, military studies, as well as Roman infrastructure in the Near East.

Kennedy established (1978) and directed (until 2018) the Aerial Photographic Archive for Archaeology in the Middle East (APAAME), a project designed to investigate, document and photograph archaeological sites throughout this region using remote sensing. This includes historical imagery and mapping, satellite imagery and aerial photography. The project is designed both to develop a methodology suited to the region and to illuminate settlement history in the Near East.

Between 1997 and 2018 Kennedy conducted annual aerial reconnaissance over Jordan – the Aerial Archaeology in Jordan (AAJ) project, as part of the Aerial Archaeology in Jordan project. the first – and until recently, only such programme in the Middle East. The project digitises and makes use of international collections, as well as increasing availability of satellite imagery through programs such as Google Earth and Bing in order to conduct wider surveys of the region. A brief video made by Google for its 'Search' series David Kennedy: Ancient Ruins has been published on YouTube which explains the development of this process.

For two years from January 2018 to 2020 he was Director of the Aerial Archaeology in the Kingdom of Saudi Arabia (AlUla) (AAKSAU) and Aerial Archaeology in Kingdom of Saudi Arabia (Khaybar) (AAKSAK) projects. His other projects have included the Jarash Hinterland Survey with Fiona Baker (2005–2011), a rescue project at the Classical city of Zeugma on the Euphrates (1993–2001) and currently the Aerial Photographic Archive for Archaeology in the Middle East.

David Kennedy's work on aerial photography and satellite surveys has also resulted in part of his research being directed towards more ancient archaeological remains in the Near East, such as Desert Kites. Kennedy has been working on making research more accessible by publishing in iBook format, the first of which is the Kites in Arabia ibook which was made available on iTunes.<ref>Kites in 'Arabia'''. iBook (2014) (with R. Banks and P. Houghton). See also http://www.apaame.org/2014/09/publications-kites-in-arabia-ibook.html</ref> In February 2016 an article titled 93-Mile-Long Ancient Wall in Jordan Puzzles Archaeologists was published on LiveScience which showcases some of the recent activity in this research area undertaken by David Kennedy and his team.

Published works
Select publications:

Books
 Archaeological Explorations on the Roman Frontier in North East Jordan. The Roman and Byzantine military installations and road network on the ground and from the air. (Including unpublished work by Sir Aurel Stein and with a contribution by D.N. Riley) (1982). Oxford (BAR, International Series 132).
 Sir Aurel Stein's Limes Report. (The full text of M.A. Stein's unpublished Limes Report (his aerial and ground reconnaissances in Iraq and Transjordan in 1938–39) (1985). Oxford (BAR, International Series 272). (edited by D.L. Kennedy and S. Gregory)
 The Defence of the Roman And Byzantine East. 2 vols. (1986) Oxford (BAR, International Series 297 = British Institute of Archaeology at Ankara Monograph No. 8)
 The Roman Army in the East, Journal of Roman Archaeology, Supplementary Series. (1996) Ann Arbor, Michigan.
 Rome's Desert Frontier from the Air. (1990) London and Austin, TX (Batsford and University of Texas Press) (with D.N. Riley).
 Into the Sun: Essays in Air Photography in Archaeology in Honour of Derrick Riley. (1989) Sheffield: Department of Archaeology and Prehistory. (edited by D.L. Kennedy)
 The Twin Towns of Zeugma on the Euphrates. Rescue Work and Historical Studies, Journal of Roman Archaeology, Supplementary Series, (1998) Portsmouth, Rhode Island.
 Ancient Jordan from the Air. (2004) London (Council for British Research in the Levant) (with R.H.Bewley).
 The Roman Army in Jordan, 2nd edition. (2004) London (Council for British Research in the Levant).
 Gerasa and the Decapolis: A 'Virtual Island' in Northwest Jordan, Duckworth Debates in Archaeology (2007), London (Gerald Duckworth & Co. Ltd).
 Settlement and Soldiers in the Roman Near East. (2013) Farnham (Ashgate).
 Kites in 'Arabia'. iBook (2014) (with R. Banks and P. Houghton)

Chapters in Books
 "The British Association for the Advancement of Science Expedition to Moab in 1872. Ginsburg and Tristram: an old academic quarrel?”, in N. Cooke (ed.)  Journeys Erased by Time. The Rediscovered Footprints of Travellers in Egypt and the Near East, (2019) Oxford (Archaeopress): 267–286
 "Christianity in the Landscape of Roman and Umayyad Philadelphia: Evidence and inference", in H. Jackson and E. Minchin (eds) Text and the Material World, Essays in Honour of Graeme Clarke, Studies in Mediterranean Archaeology series (SIMA) PB 185, (2017) Uppsala (Astrom Editions): 227–242
  "Endangered Archaeology in the Middle East and North Africa: Introducing the EAMENA Project", in S. Campana, R. Scopigno, G. Carpentiero, and M.  Cirillo (eds), CAA2015. Keep the Revolution Going: Proceedings of the 43rd Annual Conference on Computer Applications and Quantitative Methods in Archaeology, (2016) Oxford (Archaeopress Archaeology): 919–32 (with Bewley, R., Wilson, A. I., Kennedy, D., Mattingly, D., Banks, R., Bishop, M., Bradbury, J., Cunliffe, E., Fradley, M., Jennings, R., Mason, R., Rayne, L., Sterry, M., Sheldrick, N., and Zerbini, A.).
 'Thapsacus and Zeugma' in East and West in the World Empire of Alexander. Essays in Honour of Brian Bosworth. (2015) Oxford (OUP). pp. 277–298. (edited by P. Wheatley, and E. Baynham)
 'Historical aerial imagery in Jordan and the wider Middle East', in Archaeology from Historical Aerial and Satellite Archives. (2012) London (Springer). pp. 221–242. (with R.H. Bewley) (edited by W.S. Hanson, and I.A. Oltean)
 'Archives and Aerial Imagery in Jordan. Rescuing the Archaeology of Greater Amman from Rapid Urban Sprawl', in Landscapes Through the Lens: Aerial Photographs and the Historic Environment. (2010), Oxford (Oxbow Books). pp. 193–206. (with R.H. Bewley) (edited by D.C. Cowley, R.A. Standring, and M.J. Abicht)
 'Aerial Archaeology in the Middle East: The Role of the Military – Past, Present ... and Future?', in Aerial Archaeology. Developing Future Practice, Amsterdam (NATO Science Series – Series 1: Life and Behavioural Sciences.  Volume 337). (2002). pp. 33–48 & pp. 346–347. (edited by R.H. Bewley and W. Raczkowski)
 'Aerial Archaeology in Jordan: Khirbet Ain and Vicinity,' in Australians Uncovering Ancient Jordan. (2001) Sydney (The Research Institute for Humanities and Social Sciences, The University of Sydney/ The Department of Antiquities of Jordan). pp. 207–214 (edited by A. Walmsley)
 'Khirbet Khaw: a Roman town and fort in northern Jordan', in Archaeology of the Roman Empire: a Tribute to the Life and Works of Professor Barri Jones. (2001) Oxford (BAR, International Series 940). pp. 173–188 (edited by N. Higham).
 'Monitoring the Past: the Role of Aerial Survey in a Rapidly Changing Landscape', in Australians Uncovering Ancient Jordan. (2001) Sydney (The Research Institute for Humanities and Social Sciences, The University of Sydney/ The Department of Antiquities of Jordan). pp. 69–76 (with R. Bewley) (edited by A. Walmsley)
 'The identity of Roman Gerasa: an archaeological approach', in Identities in the Eastern Mediterranean in Antiquity, Sydney (= Mediterranean Archaeology 11, 1998). (1999) pp. 39–69 (edited by G. Clarke)
 'The special command of M. Valerius Lollianus', in Donum Amicitiae. Studies in Ancient History (1997). Krákow (= Electrum 1): 69–81. (edited by E. Dabrowa)
 "(The Frontiers:) The East", in The Roman World (1987). pp. 266–308. Bibliography of Part 4, pp. 309–325 (passim).  London, Routledge. (edited by J.A. Wacher)
 '"Europaean" soldiers at the Severan siege of Hatra', in The Defence of the Roman and Byzantine East. (1986) Oxford. pp. 397–409 (BAR, International Series 297 = British Institute of Archaeology at Ankara Monograph No. 8) (edited by P. Freeman and D. Kennedy)

Recent Articles
 "Demography, the population of Syria and the census of Q. Aemilius Secundus", Levant 38 (2006): 109–124
 "Castra Legionis VI Ferrata: A Building Inscription for the Late Roman Legionary Fortress at Udruh, Jordan", Journal of Roman Archaeology 21 (2008): 150–169 (with H. Falahat) 
 "Aerial Archaeology in Jordan", Antiquity 83 (2009): 69–81 (with R. Bewley) 
 "The Roman Near East", The International Historical Review, 28.2 (2006) 353–368. Review article:- M. Sartre, The Middle East under Rome, Cambridge, Mass (Harvard UP). Pp. xiv and 665
 "The Roman army and frontier east of the Dead Sea", Journal of Roman Archaeology 21 (2008): 669–686. Review article:- S. T. Parker, The Roman Frontier in Central Jordan, 2 vols, 2006, Washington (Dumbarton Oaks).
 '"Nomad Villages" in North-eastern Jordan: from Roman Arabia to Umayyad Urdunn, Arabian Archaeology and Epigraphy 25. (2014) pp. 96–109.
 'The Cairn of Hani: Significance, present condition and context', Annual of the Department of Antiquities of Jordan 56. (2014) pp. 483–505.
 '"Big Circles": A new type of prehistoric site in Jordan and Syria', Zeitschrift für Orient-Archäologie 6. (2013) pp. 44–63.
 'Editorial: Wheels in the Harret al-Shaam', Palestine Exploration Quarterly 144.2. (2012) pp. 77–81.
 'Kites – New Discoveries and a New Type', Arabian Archaeology and Epigraphy 23. (2012) pp. 145–155
 'Pioneers Above Jordan. Revealing a prehistoric landscape', Antiquity 86. (2012) pp. 474–491.
 'Google Earth and the Archaeology of Saudi Arabia. A case study from the Jeddah area', Journal of Archaeological Science 38 (2011). pp. 1284–1293. (with M.C. Bishop)
 'Recovering the Past from Above. Hibabiya: an early Islamic village in the Jordanian desert?' Arabian Archaeology and Epigraphy 22 (2011). pp. 253–260.
 The Works of the Old Men' in Arabia: remote sensing in interior Arabia', Journal of Archaeological Science 38 (2011). pp. 3185–3202
 'Aerial Archaeology in Jordan', Antiquity, 83, 319 (2009). pp. 69–81. (with R. Bewley)
 "Kites in Saudi Arabia", Arabian Archaeology and Epigraphy 26 (2015): 177–195 (and Banks, R. E. and Dalton, M.)
 "The Khatt Shebib in Jordan: from the Air and Space", Zeitschrift für Orient-Archäologie 8 (2015): 132–155 (with R. Banks)
 "Aerial Archaeology in Jordan: Summary report for 2014", CBRL Bulletin 10 (2015): 77–82 (with Bewley, R. H., Kennedy, D. L. and Banks, R. E.) 
 "Prime Suspect: William Cowper Prime in the Holy Land and the identity of 'An American' in Harper’s New Monthly Magazine, 1858", Palestine Exploration Quarterly 148 (2016): 110–132. (and B. Hirsch)
  "Losing – and salvaging? – the Rural Landscape of Graeco-Roman Philadelphia", Palestine Exploration Quarterly 149:2 (2017): 135–161 DOI: 10.1080/00310328.2016.1277675
  “'Gates' – a new archaeological site type in Saudi Arabia", Arabian Archaeology and Epigraphy 28 (2017): 153–174 DOI: 10.1111/aae.12100
 "Travellers to 1857 to Petra", in Z. M. Al-Salameen & M. B. Tarawneh (eds), Refereed Proceedings of the First Conference on the Archaeology and Tourism of the Maan Governorate, 3rd- 4 October 2017 Petra- Jordan, (2018), Ma’an (Supplement to Al-Hussein Bin Talal University's Journal of Research, AHUJ) (Deanship of Scientific Research and Graduate Studies, Al-Hussein Bin Talal University): 187–207

References

 Academia.edu Profile https://uwa.academia.edu/DavidKennedy
 Aerial Photographic Archive for Archaeology in the Middle East (APAAME) http://www.apaame.org
 University of Western Australia Staff Profiles http://www.web.uwa.edu.au/people/david.kennedy

British archaeologists
Australian archaeologists
Alumni of the University of Oxford
Academic staff of the University of Western Australia
1948 births
Living people